John Browett (born 1963) is a British businessman. Between January 2016 and August 2017 he was chief executive of the Dunelm Group.  From March 2013 to February 2015, he was chief executive of the British clothing retailer Monsoon Accessorize, and from April 2012 to October 2012 he was senior vice-president of retail at Apple Inc.

Early life
Browett was born in Leicester in 1963. He attended Uppingham Community College, a comprehensive school in Uppingham, then Rutland Sixth Form College in Oakham. He studied Zoology at Magdalene College, Cambridge, worked briefly for Kleinwort Benson, and then did an MBA at the Wharton School of the University of Pennsylvania in the United States.

Career
From 1993 to 1998 Browett worked for the Boston Consulting Group, and then moved to Tesco, where from 1999 to 2004 he was chief executive of Tesco.com.

From 5 December 2007 to 20 February 2012 Browett was group chief executive of the troubled electronics retailer Dixons, where he helped to improve the company's poor reputation for customer service.

In April 2012 Browett took over from Ron Johnson as senior vice-president of retail at Apple in Cupertino, California. On 29 October 2012 Apple announced that Browett was leaving the company, and that a new head of retail was being sought. In May 2019, Bloomberg attributed his departure to his "morale-damaging" efforts following employee firings, cut hours, fewer promotions and a reduction in overtime for staff operating within Apple Stores that led to Tim Cook firing him.

In March 2013 Browett was appointed chief executive of Monsoon Accessorize. In his first year in charge the company returned to profitability, with pre-tax profits of £18.1 million in the financial year to 31 August 2013, compared to a pre-tax loss of £2.4 million in the previous year.

He left Monsoon in February 2015, and became chief executive designate of the Dunelm Group from July of that year, expected to take over the position from January 2016. By the end of August 2017 Browett had left Dunelm where he was seen, as with Apple, as a bad fit for the culture of the company. Since 2018, he has been at BillSave UK.

See also
Outline of Apple Inc. (personnel)
History of Apple Inc.

References 

Living people
1963 births
Alumni of Magdalene College, Cambridge
Apple Inc. executives
British retail chief executives
People from Leicester
People from Uppingham
Tesco people
Wharton School of the University of Pennsylvania alumni